Geispitzen is a commune in the Haut-Rhin department in Alsace in north-eastern France.

Humans have occupied Geispitzen since the Neolithic period. Thereafter, two Gallo-Roman settlements were spotted there, as remains of the Kembs - Besançon Roman road can still be found to this day. A village, which disappeared before medieval times, was also located in the Altrad locality. The first mentions of the commune's name date back to 1267. The village benefited from two remarkable development periods: one at the end of the 16th century and the beginning of the 17th century, the second at the end of the 17th century after the Thirty Years' War. The village endured significant destruction during the Second World War, and a modern estate was built around 1970.

The commune's gentilic are Geispitzenoises and Geispitzenois (Geispitzenians in English).

See also
 Communes of the Haut-Rhin département

References

Communes of Haut-Rhin